Recreio Desportivo de Águeda commonly known as simply as Recreio de Águeda is a Portuguese sports club from Águeda, Aveiro. 10 April 1924. It currently plays at the Estádio Municipal de Águeda which also plays host to the club's reserve and youth teams. The club has played once in the Primeira Liga in the 1983–84 season, where after one season the club was relegated.

Current squad

League and Cup history

Honours
II Division – Zona Centro
 Winners (1): 1982–83
 Runners-up (1): 1985–86

AF Aveiro First Division
 Winners (5): 1966–67, 1973–74, 2005–06, 2007–08, 2015–16

AF Aveiro Cup
 Winners (3): 1947–48, 2014–15, 2015–16

AF Aveiro SuperCup
 Winners (3): 2007–08, 2014–15, 2015–16
 Runners-up (1): 2013–14

References

External links
 Official Site
 Profile at ForaDeJogo
 Profile at ZeroZero

Football clubs in Portugal
Association football clubs established in 1924
1924 establishments in Portugal
Primeira Liga clubs
Liga Portugal 2 clubs